Zaurbek Olegovich Kambolov (born 4 March 1992) is a Russian-Ossetian professional football player.

Club career
He made his Russian Premier League debut for FC Alania Vladikavkaz on 4 August 2012 in a game against FC Terek Grozny.

External links
 
 

1992 births
Sportspeople from Vladikavkaz
Living people
Russian footballers
Association football wingers
Russian Premier League players
FC Spartak Vladikavkaz players
FC SKA-Khabarovsk players
FC Mashuk-KMV Pyatigorsk players